Cycling at the 2003 South Pacific Games was held from 3–5 July 2003 on the Suva foreshore in Fiji. Three women's road cycling events were contested, with New Caledonia winning two gold medals and Tahiti winning one.

Teams
The five nations competing were:
 Fiji
 New Caledonia
 Northern Mariana Islands
 Palau
 Tahiti

Medal summary

Medal table

Women's results

References

Cycling at the Pacific Games
2003 South Pacific Games
Pacific Games